Lossa can refer to:

 Lossa, Finne, a village in Saxony-Anhalt, Germany
 Lossa, Thalwitz, a village in Saxony, Germany
 Lossa (Mulde), a river of Saxony, Germany, tributary of the Mulde
 Lossa (Unstrut), a river of Saxony-Anhalt and Thuringia, Germany, tributary of the Unstrut
 Lossa Engineering, a motorcycle manufacturer in California